Cornelis "Kees" Evertsen de Liefde ( – 29 September 1673) was a Dutch naval commander, a role also fulfilled by his younger brother Johan de Liefde

Life 
In 1644, he was a skipper on shipping between Rotterdam and Amsterdam. During the First Anglo-Dutch War, he had no rank and it is uncertain whether he was in the navy at that time. During the Second Anglo-Dutch War, he was made a captain of the Admiralty of the Maze on 17 March 1666.

He fought in the Four Days' Battle as flag-captain to Lieutenant Admiral Aert Jansse van Nes on board the Eendragt. On 4 February 1667, he was promoted to full captain. In the Raid on the Medway he commanded the Wassenaer.

During the Third Anglo-Dutch War, he fought in the battle of Solebay, in command of the Rotterdam. He rose to schout-bij-nacht on 21 August, after commanding the Gelderland at the battle of Texel, in which he was badly wounded and in which his brother Johan killed.

Kees married Maria Hendriks van der Lit and had five children.

Footnotes

Bibliography 

1617 births
1673 deaths
Admirals of the navy of the Dutch Republic
Dutch military personnel killed in action
Dutch naval personnel of the Anglo-Dutch Wars
Military personnel from Rotterdam